Aq Bolagh Rural District is in Sojas Rud District of Khodabandeh County, Zanjan province, Iran. At the National Census of 2006, its population was 5,996 in 1,226 households. There were 5,757 inhabitants in 1,461 households at the following census of 2011. At the most recent census of 2016, the population of the rural district was 5,228 in 1,503 households. The largest of its 19 villages was Arqin, with 1,110 people.

References 

Khodabandeh County

Rural Districts of Zanjan Province

Populated places in Zanjan Province

Populated places in Khodabandeh County